Sarısüleymanlar is a village in the Savaştepe district of Balıkesir province in Turkey.

References

Villages in Savaştepe District